The Garden History Society was an organisation in the United Kingdom established to study the history of gardening and to protect historic gardens. In 2015 it became The Gardens Trust, having merged with the Association of Gardens Trusts.

It was founded in 1966, and was a registered charity with headquarters in London. Membership was around 1,500 prior to its merger in 2015.

Presidents included Mavis Batey and Sir Roy Strong. The final Chairman was landscape architect Dominic Cole.

The Society, then the Trust, has published a quarterly journal, Garden History since 1970.  the editor was Dr Barbara Simms.

Statutory role
From 1995 the Garden History Society was a statutory consultee in relation to planning proposals which affect historic designed landscapes identified by English Heritage as being of national significance, and which are included on the Register of Parks and Gardens of Special Historic Interest in England. Thus when a planning authority received a planning application which affected a site on the Register, or the setting of such a site, the planning authority had to consult the Society.

Editors of Garden History
Before Barbara Simms, previous editors of Garden History were:

Christopher Thacker (1970–80)
John Anthony (1980)
W.A Brogden  (1981–3)
Brent Elliott  (1984–8 and 1989)
Robert Oresko (1988)
Jane Crawley and Elisabeth Whittle (1989–97)
Jan Woudstra (1998–2004)
Andrew Eburne (2004–06)

See also

 Australian Garden History Society
 Garden Museum
 National Register of Historic Parks and Gardens
 Royal Horticultural Society
 Historic garden conservation

References

External links

Charities based in England
Gardening in the United Kingdom
1966 establishments in the United Kingdom
Horticultural organisations based in the United Kingdom
Garden design history of England